The Norwegian Bankers' Association was an employers' organisation in Norway, organized under the national Confederation of Norwegian Enterprise.

It was established in 1915, but in 2000 it was merged with the Association of Norwegian Insurance Companies to form the Norwegian Financial Services Association.

References

Defunct employers' organisations in Norway
Organizations established in 1915
Organizations disestablished in 2000